Martin Dechev (born 12 April 1990) is a Bulgarian footballer who plays as a defender.

References

External links
 

Living people
1990 births
Bulgarian footballers
First Professional Football League (Bulgaria) players
Association football defenders
PFC CSKA Sofia players
PFC Lokomotiv Mezdra players
PFC Ludogorets Razgrad players
PFC Cherno More Varna players
FC Montana players
FC Vitosha Bistritsa players
FC Oborishte players
PFC Slavia Sofia players